Dealu Mare may refer to several villages in Romania:

 Dealu Mare, in Măgura Commune, Bacău County
 Dealu Mare, in the city of Dorohoi, Botoșani County
 Dealu Mare, in Râșca Commune, Cluj County
 Dealu Mare, in Buciumeni Commune, Dâmbovița County
 Dealu Mare, in Vălișoara Commune, Hunedoara County
 Dealu Mare, in Coroieni Commune, Maramureș County
 Dealu Mare, in the town of Baia de Aramă, Mehedinți County
 Dealu Mare, in Zorleni Commune, Vaslui County
 Dealu Mare, in Galicea Commune, Vâlcea County
 Dealu Mare, in Gușoeni Commune, Vâlcea County
 Dealu Mare, in Ionești Commune, Vâlcea County

Other uses
Dealu Mare wine region